Patsy Smart (14 August 1918 – 6 February 1996) was an English actress, best remembered for her performance as Miss Roberts in the 1970s ITV television drama Upstairs, Downstairs.

She also appeared in: Danger Man, Only When I Laugh, Dixon of Dock Green, Z-Cars, The Prisoner, The Avengers, The Sweeney, Doctor Who (The Talons of Weng-Chiang), Blake's 7, Danger UXB, The Chinese Detective, Minder, Rentaghost, Terry and June, Farrington of the F.O., Casualty, Hallelujah!, and The Bill.

In her later roles, she was expert at playing dotty old ladies, her Mrs Sibley and Miss Dingle characters in Terry and June being examples. Another example was as the wife of the gardener in the Miss Marple episode "The Moving Finger" which starred Joan Hickson.

Her films included Sons and Lovers (1960), The Tell Tale Heart (1960), Return of a Stranger (1961), What Every Woman Wants (1962), Arthur? Arthur! (1969), Leo the Last (1970), The Raging Moon (1971), Great Expectations (1974), Exposé (1976), The Pink Panther Strikes Again (1976), Tess (1979), The Elephant Man (1980) and The Fourth Protocol (1987).

Patsy Smart died of barbiturate poisoning on 6 February 1996, aged 77.

Partial filmography

The Flying Scot (1957) - Mother (uncredited)
Sons and Lovers (1960) - Emma
The Tell Tale Heart (1960) - Mrs. Marlow
Return of a Stranger (1961) - Mrs. Rayner
Design for Loving (1962) - Landlady
What Every Woman Wants (1962) - Hilda
Arthur? Arthur! (1969) - Miss Bonnamie
Leo the Last (1970) - Mrs. Kowalski
The Raging Moon (1971) - Bruce's Mother
Steptoe and Son (1972) - Mrs. Hobbs
O Lucky Man! (1973)
Great Expectations (1974) - Mrs. Wopsle
One of Our Dinosaurs Is Missing (1975) - Old Maid (uncredited)
Exposé (1976) - Mrs. Aston
The Bawdy Adventures of Tom Jones (1976) - Village Gossip (uncredited)
The Pink Panther Strikes Again (1976) - Mrs. Japonica
The Hound of the Baskervilles (1978) - Masseuse (uncredited)
The Legacy (1978) - Cook
Tess (1979) - Housekeeper
The Wildcats of St. Trinian's (1980) - Miss Warmold
The Elephant Man (1980) - Distraught Woman
Electric Dreams (1984) - Lady in Ticket Line
The Chain (1984) - Old Lady
The Fourth Protocol (1987) - Preston's Housekeeper

References

External links
 

1918 births
1996 deaths
Burials at West Norwood Cemetery
English people of Australian descent
English television actresses
20th-century British actresses
People from Chingford
20th-century English women
20th-century English people